Ralph A.L. Bogan, Jr. (October 31, 1922-June 9, 2013) was a businessman who co-owned the Milwaukee/Atlanta Braves in the 1960s and 1970s. He was a partner in the group that purchased the team in 1962.

He also worked for the Greyhound Bus company – where his father, Ralph Bogan, Sr., was a high-ranking executive – was a private equity investor, and CEO of National Security Bank in Chicago.,/Treasurer of the One-Hundred Club of Chicago Police Department 1973-2013.

Personal life
Ralph Alcott Lester Bogan Jr. was born in Hibbing Minnesota. He attended Evanston Township High School, Choate Rosemary Hall and Lake Forest Academy, then Dartmouth College and the University of Pennsylvania. He served on a destroyer in the Navy during World War II.,//Ralph Bogan was married to Peggy Wickman Bogan for 33 years. They had four daughters: Pamela, Sandra, Karen and Diane. And 13 grandchildren: Alicia, Andrew-Eric, Megan, Colleen, Cheryl, Luke, Mark, Amanda, Nate, Seth, Zach, Abby and Jessica. And 5 great-grandchildren. He died in Lincoln Park, Chicago.

References

1922 births
2013 deaths
Lake Forest Academy alumni
Atlanta Braves owners
United States Navy personnel of World War II